Buda is a city in Hays County, Texas, United States. The population was 15,108 in 2020, up from 7,295 counted in 2010. Buda is part of the Austin-Round Rock-San Marcos metropolitan statistical area and is one of Austin's fastest growing suburbs. Residents of Buda are referred to as Budans.

History
The town of Buda sprang up along the route of the International-Great Northern Railroad, which was extended from Austin to San Antonio in 1880. Buda bore the name of "Du Pre" from its birth in 1881 until the autumn of 1887, when postal officials became aware that another Texas town was also named Du Pre. Several businesses sprang up, including the Carrington Hotel, which served meals to railroad travelers. By the time Du Pre found a new name for itself, the Carrington hotel was known as the "Buda House". The "Dupre Notes" column of the Sept. 25, 1886, edition of the Hays County Times and Farmer's Journal notes that "The Buda House is one of the best hotels in the state. The polite and entertaining hostess, Mrs. Carrington, meets all with a courteous welcome." According to the town's oral tradition, "Buda" is a corruption of the Spanish word viuda, or "widow", referencing the widows who supposedly worked as cooks at the Carrington Hotel. Others suggest that like the town of Buda, Illinois, the town name is a nod to the exiles of the failed Hungarian Revolution of 1848 who settled in the area.

Buda was incorporated in 1948. By the mid-1980s it had attracted a cement plant and some craft industry.

Geography
Buda is in northeastern Hays County, at  (30.084229, −97.839081). Just to the north of Buda is Texas State Highway 45, a major toll loop of Austin. Almost immediately north of Buda is the county line bordering Travis County and the Austin city limits.

Onion Creek flows through the northwest side of the city, a tributary of the Colorado River.

Education
Buda is served by the Hays Consolidated Independent School District. Buda Elementary, built in 1885, sits just outside Main Street and serves 500 students from the Buda area. Buda students attend Carpenter Hill Elementary School, Elm Grove Elementary School, Dahlstrom Middle School, Jack C. Hays High School, and Moe and Gene Johnson High School.

Economy
Buda is home to numerous fast-growing small- to medium-sized businesses.

Culture

Buda is a commuter town south of Austin. Commercial development along the I-35 corridor, such as the Cabela's sporting goods store, has increased city sales tax revenue, and city leaders hope that further revitalization of downtown Buda will attract tourists and residents to the Main Street area.

Buda attracts national attention for its lighthearted wiener dog races, organized every April by the Buda Lions Club. Rooster Teeth Productions, the creators of the machinima series Red vs. Blue and The Strangerhood, had its office in Buda until moving back to Austin.

In 2009, Buda joined the Film Friendly Texas Program, which trains community leaders about the film production process and how to effectively facilitate filming requests.

Government
Buda is a home rule city with a council-manager form of government. Other governmental entities include the Buda Planning and Zoning Commission, the Historical Commission, the Parks Commission, the Board of Adjustments and the Economic Development Corporation. Citizen Groups active in local politics include the Buda Area Chamber of Commerce and the Buda Downtown Merchants Association.

In November 2007, Buda citizens adopted a home rule charter by a margin of 77.85 percent, allowing the city to transition from general law to home rule.

Demographics

As of the 2020 United States census, there were 15,108 people, 5,827 households, and 4,314 families residing in the city.

As of the census of 2000, there were 2,404 people, 866 households, and 685 families residing in the city. Based on utility hook-ups, the city estimated its 2008 population to be in excess of 5,000 residents. The population density was 998.5 people per square mile (385.1/km2). There were 910 housing units at an average density of 378.0 per square mile (145.8/km2). The racial makeup of the city was 81.95% White, 1.58% African American, 0.54% Native American, 0.87% Asian, 12.02% from other races, and 3.04% from two or more races. Hispanic or Latino of any race were 26.83% of the population.

There were 866 households, out of which 44.7% had children under the age of 18 living with them, 65.5% were married couples living together, 10.9% had a female householder with no husband present, and 20.8% were non-families. 17.1% of all households were made up of individuals, and 7.5% had someone living alone who was 65 years of age or older. The average household size was 2.78 and the average family size was 3.13.

In the city, the population was spread out, with 29.7% under the age of 18, 6.4% from 18 to 24, 36.7% from 25 to 44, 19.7% from 45 to 64, and 7.4% who were 65 years of age or older. The median age was 32 years. For every 100 females, there were 92.3 males. For every 100 females age 18 and over, there were 90.3 males.

The median income for a household in the city was $54,135, and the median income for a family was $57,321. Males had a median income of $37,398 versus $30,064 for females. The per capita income for the city was $22,167. About 3.3% of families and 3.7% of the population were below the poverty line, including 5.0% of those under age 18 and 14.7% of those age 65 or over.

As of 2007, Buda recorded $384 million of assessed property value within city limits. Based on a February 2007 survey of 14 central Texas cities, Buda had the highest per capita assessed property value at $85,431 per resident. The city recorded more than $3 million in sales tax collection in 2006, for a per capita sales tax collection of $675.

Notable people

 Gary Clarke, retired actor, co-starred on The Virginian, 1962–1964
 Jen Hatmaker, author, blogger
 Tex Hughson, Boston Red Sox pitcher
 Samuel Ealy Johnson Jr., Texas state legislator and father of President Lyndon Johnson
 Donald K. Muchow, Rear Admiral and former U.S. Navy Chief of Chaplains (1994–1997)

 Tommy Shannon, musician and former bass player of Stevie Ray Vaughan Double Trouble.

See also 

 Garlic Creek

Gallery

References

External links

 City of Buda official website
 Buda Economic Development Corporation
 Buda's Transportation Master Plan
 Buda News
 The Hays Free Press – Local newspaper serving Buda, Kyle and northern Hays County
 
 Hays Consolidated Independent School District
 Buda Area Chamber of Commerce
 Wiener Dog Races
 Buda Public Library

Cities in Texas
Cities in Hays County, Texas
Cities in Greater Austin
Populated places established in 1881
1881 establishments in Texas